is a manga series that mixes comedy with Pokémon battling.

It began publication in 2005 in CoroCoro Special and has been published into tankōbon.

Plot
The series stars Enta, a boy who has dreams of becoming the strongest pokémon trainer, but due to his lack of skill and the fact that he's a rookie trainer, he constantly loses. But with the help of Rald, an experienced trainer (also his training master), and Mitsuki (a pretty boy), who is forced to help Enta whenever he wants to participate in a double battle. The owner of the Battle Frontier Enishida (a.k.a. Scott) who introduces Enta to the Battle Frontier and occasionally gives him pointers on how to be a good trainer. The series doesn't seem to follow any regular story line (fighting to obtain the symbols in this case for example) but instead is more focused on putting Enta into a random set of adventures. Following Enta is a mysterious photographer who turns out to be the strongest Frontier Brain: Salon Maiden Anabel.

This manga was translated into English by Chuang Yi in Singapore under the name Pokémon Battle Frontier in 2007.

External links
 Pocket Monsters Emerald Chousen!! Battle Frontier

2005 manga
Children's manga
Pokémon manga
Shogakukan manga